Phyllosticta hawaiiensis is a fungal plant pathogen infecting sugarcane.

References

External links
USDA ARS Fungal Database

Fungal plant pathogens and diseases
Sugarcane diseases
hawaiiensis
Fungi described in 1953